{{Infobox Ethnic group
|group=Lookout Rancheria
|popplace=
|rels=traditional tribal religion, Christianity
|langs=English
|related=other Pit River Indians
|population=1800 Pit River Indians, 10 living on rancheria<ref name=sdsu>"Lookout Rancheria." SDSU: California Indians and their Reservations." Retrieved 29 Nov 2012.</ref>}}

The Lookout Rancheria is a federal Indian reservation belonging to the Pit River Tribe, a federally recognized tribe of indigenous people of California. The ranchería is located in Modoc County in northern California.

Lookout Rancheria is  large and was established in 1913. The rancheria is adjacent to the Shasta National Forest and located about halfway between Burney and Alturas in northeastern California.

Education
The ranchería is served by the Big Valley Joint Unified School District.

See also
 Lookout, California

Notes

References
 Pritzker, Barry M. A Native American Encyclopedia: History, Culture, and Peoples.'' Oxford: Oxford University Press, 2000. .

External links
 Pit River Tribe, official website

Pit River tribes
Modoc County, California
American Indian reservations in California
Native American tribes in California
Federally recognized tribes in the United States